Capital Acquisitions and Management Corporation (CAMCO) was a United States debt collection agency and subsidiary of Risk Management Financial Services, Inc., that was fined and closed down for repeated violations of the Fair Debt Collection Practices Act (FDCPA). Its closure marked the first time a Federal Trade Commission investigation shut down a collection company.

CAMCO was a debt buyer focused on long overdue accounts - sometimes over a decade old, i.e. well beyond the statute of limitations - that it purchased for less than a penny on the dollar. Its employees would contact debtors by phone to collect funds. Consumers complained that collectors were calling late at night and/or using  threatening language. Consumers also complained that they often had never heard of the supposed debt.  After receiving numerous complaints from consumers regarding these abusive debt collection practices, the Federal Trade Commission (FTC) began an investigation of CAMCO in 2003.  On 24 March 2004, the FTC filed a formal complaint alleging multiple violations of the FDCPA.  On the same day, a consent decree was entered, in which CAMCO agreed to pay a $300,000 civil penalty and to refrain from further violations of the law.

Notwithstanding the agreement, complaints of violations from consumers continued.  Accordingly, on 3 December 2004, the FTC obtained an injunction against CAMCO and its owners and froze their assets. CAMCO headquarters were shut down by local police officers and representatives from the Federal Trade Commission and the company ceased functioning.

The company was put into receivership and was forced to sell the consumer debts it had bought for collection. On January 19, 2005, the debts were sold at a public auction in New York to another debt buyer.

On 30 November 2006, CAMCO and the Federal Trade Commission entered into a stipulated settlement Order whereby CAMCO, its owners and its affiliated companies agreed to pay an additional $1 million penalty and to a permanent ban from engaging in any debt collection activity.

External links and references
March 2004 FTC Complaint
March 2004 Consent Decree
December 2004 injunction and asset freeze Order
ABC news article
FTC Report on 2006 agreement and fine

Footnotes

Defunct financial services companies of the United States